Rip Roarin' Buckaroo is a 1936 American Western film directed by Robert F. Hill.

Cast 
Tom Tyler as "Scotty" McQuade
Beth Marion as Betty Rose Hayden
Sammy Cohen as "Frozen-Face" Cohen
Forrest Taylor as Lew Slater
Charles King as "Bones" Kennedy
John Elliott as Colonel Hayden
Theodore Lorch as Ted Todd - Trainer
Richard Cramer as Sheriff
Wimpy the Dog as Alexander

External links 

1936 films
1936 Western (genre) films
1930s English-language films
American black-and-white films
American Western (genre) films
Films directed by Robert F. Hill
1930s American films